Khairuddin bin Abdul Rahim is a Malaysian politician from PKR. He is the Member of Johor State Legislative Assembly for Senggarang from 2018 to 2022.

Politics 
He contested for the Parit Sulong parliamentary seat on the ticket of PAS in the 2013 Malaysian general election but lost it. After that, he joined AMANAH and successfully won the Senggarang seat against the UMNO candidate with a small majority. He was the secretary for AMANAH Johor before joining PKR on 27 February 2021.

Election result

Reference 

People from Johor
Malaysian Islamic Party politicians
People's Justice Party (Malaysia) politicians
National Trust Party (Malaysia) politicians
Malaysian people of Malay descent
Living people
1959 births
Members of the Johor State Legislative Assembly